The Chesapeake Beach Rail Trail (sometimes referred to as the Chesapeake Beach Railway Trail) is a set of short trails along the original Chesapeake Beach Railway route from Washington, D.C. to Chesapeake Beach, Maryland.  The Maryland-National Capital Park and Planning Commission (M-NCPPC) acquired portions of the corridor through the subdivision process. Some sections have already been built. Plans call for future sections to be built as available until this corridor serves as the spine for a number of greenway branches.

When developed, the trail will be owned, managed, and maintained by M-NCPPC.

Calvert County acquired a  tract adjacent to Fishing Creek and the town of Chesapeake Beach which contains  of the railroad right-of-way. This property, renamed Fishing Creek Park, is adjacent to the terminus of the trail at Chesapeake Railroad Museum. A trail was developed on this portion of the right-of-way with a connection to residential communities within the vicinity, providing off-road access to the towns of Chesapeake Beach and North Beach and their in-town boardwalks and trails. In September 2004, the state of Maryland committed $1.6 million for construction of the first  of trail to begin in the fall of 2005. This was pushed back to 2008 and the work was completed in 2011, with a dedication on September 30, 2011.

In Anne Arundel County the trail would connect Walker Mill Regional Park and Jug Bay Wetlands Sanctuary. It would also connect to the south with the town of Chesapeake Beach.

Sidewalks along Ritchie Marlboro Road serve as the trail in the area near the Beltway.

References 

Geography of Washington, D.C.
Rail trails in Maryland